Second Youth or Druga młodość is a 1938 Polish romantic drama film directed by Michał Waszyński.

Cast
Maria Gorczyńska...  Irena Mohort 
Kazimierz Junosza-Stępowski ...  Ludwik Mohort 
Witold Zacharewicz ...  Jerzy Oledzki 
Mieczysław Cybulski ...  Ryszard Mohort 
Wlodzimierz Lozinski ...  Pawel Mohort 
Michał Znicz ...  Klaudiusz 
Elzbieta Krynska ...  Janina 
Mieczysława Ćwiklińska ...  Janina's Mother 
Stanisława Wysocka ...  Jerzy's Grandmother 
Tamara Wiszniewska...  Tamara Korska 
Wanda Jarszewska ...  Tamara's Mother 
Paweł Owerłło ...  Tamara's Father 
Stefan Hnydziński ...  Butler 
Henryk Malkowski ...  Professor, party guest (as H. Malkowski)

External links 
 

1938 films
1930s Polish-language films
Polish black-and-white films
Films directed by Michał Waszyński
1938 romantic drama films
Polish films based on plays
Polish romantic drama films